Jones & Furbringer was an architectural firm founded in 1904 by the partnership of Walk Claridge Jones, Sr. and Max H. Furbringer. It designed a number of buildings that are listed on the U.S. National Register of Historic Places. The firm eventually was absorbed into brg3s.

Works by either architect individually or by the firm include:
Boyce-Gregg House, 317 S. Highland St. Memphis, TN (Jones & Furbringer), NRHP-listed
Cordova School, 1017 Sanga Rd. Memphis, TN (Furbringer, Max H.), NRHP-listed
Greenwood, 1560 Central Ave. Memphis, TN (Jones & Furbringer), NRHP-listed
Hotel Claridge, 109 N. Main St. Memphis, TN (Jones & Furbringer), NRHP-listed
Peabody Elementary School, 2086 Young Ave. Memphis, TN (Jones & Furbringer), NRHP-listed
Rozelle Elementary School, 993 Roland St. Memphis, TN (Jones & Furbringer), NRHP-listed
Shrine Building, (1923), 66 Monroe Ave. Memphis, TN (Jones & Furbringer), NRHP-listed

Elvis Presley's Graceland, 3764 Elvis Presley Blvd. Memphis, TN has association of architects Furbringer & Ehrman, and is also NRHP-listed

References

Architecture firms of the United States
Companies based in Memphis, Tennessee
American companies established in 1904
1904 establishments in Tennessee
Design companies established in 1904